Zong Kai (纵凯) is a Paralympian athlete from China competing mainly in category T54 Sprint events.

He competed in the 2008 Summer Paralympics in his home country in the T54 100m and 200m before combining with his teammates (Zhao Ji, Zhang Lixin, and Li Huzhao) to win the gold medal in the T53/54 4 × 100 m relay.

References

Paralympic athletes of China
Athletes (track and field) at the 2008 Summer Paralympics
Paralympic gold medalists for China
Living people
Chinese male wheelchair racers
Year of birth missing (living people)
Medalists at the 2008 Summer Paralympics
Paralympic medalists in athletics (track and field)
Medalists at the 2010 Asian Para Games